Tzvi Jacob Avni (first name sometimes spelled Zvi; ; born Hermann Jakob Steinke,  September 2, 1927; Saarbrücken) is an Israeli composer.

Biography
Tzvi Avni was born in Saarbrücken, Germany, and emigrated to Mandate Palestine as a child. He studied with Paul Ben-Haim.

On the recommendation of Edgard Varèse, he became involved with the Columbia-Princeton Electronic Music Center in the 1960s. Later he founded an electronic studio at the Jerusalem Academy of Music, following the guidelines of his mentor in New York, Vladimir Ussachevsky.

Awards
In 2001, Avni was awarded the Israel Prize, for music.
On September 11, 2012, Avni was made an honorary citizen of Saarbrücken.

Notes

References
Gluck, Bob. “Go Find Your Own Tricks!: Interview with Israeli Composer Tzvi Avni.” eContact! 14.4 — TES 2011: Toronto Electroacoustic Symposium / Symposium électroacoustique de Toronto (March 2013). Montréal: CEC.
 Gluck, Robert J. “The Columbia-Princeton Electronic Music Center: Educating international composers.” Computer Music Journal 31/2 (Summer 2007), pp. 20–38.

External links 
 Official webpage
 Tzvi Avni biography on The Israel Music Institute (IMI) website

See also
List of Israel Prize recipients

1927 births
Living people
Jewish emigrants from Nazi Germany to Mandatory Palestine
20th-century classical composers
21st-century classical composers
20th-century Israeli composers
21st-century Israeli composers
Israeli male composers
Israel Prize in music recipients
People from Saarbrücken